Kool & Deadly (Justicizms) is the second album by old school/hardcore rapper Just-Ice, it was released in 1987, and was produced by KRS-One and Just-Ice. In 1998, the album was selected as one of The Source magazine's 100 Best Rap Albums. The song "Moshitup" was the origin of the hip hop meme "Suicide, it's a suicide".

Music
The Washington Post noted that tracks "Moshitup" and "Lyric Licking" showcase reggae rhythms but the record is predominantly "sparse hip-hop, tough and raw".

Reception
In a contemporary review, The Washington Post stated that the album "has an agenda that embraces more complicated topics, but it's hardly as benevolent as [Kool Moe Dee]" and described the album as "tough and raw but not especially distinctive"

Track listing
"Going Way Back" (feat. KRS-One)
"The Original Gangster of Hip-Hop"
"Freedom of Speech"
"Moshitup" (feat. KRS-One)
"Kool & Deadly"
"On the Strength"
"Lyric Licking"
"Booga Bandit Bitch"
"Freedom Of Speech ’88" (12-inch Single Edit) [added when it was released on CD].

Charts

Weekly charts

Year-end charts

References

1987 albums
Just-Ice albums
Fresh Records (US) albums
Albums produced by KRS-One